Louisa Tuilotolava (born 30 June 1996) is a New Zealand field hockey player for the New Zealand national team.

She participated at the 2018 Women's Hockey World Cup.

References

1996 births
Living people
New Zealand female field hockey players
Female field hockey midfielders